Comorta zophopleura is a species of moth of the family Pyralidae described by Alfred Jefferis Turner in 1904. It is found in Australia.

References

Moths described in 1904
Anerastiini